Mount Tirad is a  mountain peak near Cervantes, Ilocos Sur, Philippines. It ranks as the 3rd highest mountain in Ilocos Sur and the 446th highest mountain in the Philippines.

Tirad Pass on the mountain holds a significant place in Philippine history, having been the site of the 1899 Battle of Tirad Pass, where Gregorio del Pilar was killed. In April 2022, President Rodrigo Duterte signed a law declaring the pass as a protected landscape under the National Integrated Protected Areas System.

References

Tirad
Landforms of Ilocos Sur